The Estonia women's national cricket team represents the country of Estonia in women's cricket matches. The team is organised by the Estonian Cricket Association, an associate member of the International Cricket Council (ICC).

In April 2018, the International Cricket Council (ICC) granted full Women's Twenty20 International (WT20I) status to all its members.

History
Sometime in 2012, Finland visited Estonia for a cricket tour. The venue for this cricket trip was Tallinn, Estonia.

In July 2012, Estonia played in a T20 European Tournament at Sportpark Maarschalkerweerd in Utrecht against Belgium, Germany, Gibraltar, Jersey, and a Netherlands Invitation XI side. Jersey defeated Germany in the final.

In August 2013, Estonia participated in a five-team tournament in Bologna (along with Denmark, Gibraltar, Italy, and Belgium), with Italy winning the tournament.

See also
 Estonia national cricket team

References

External links
 
 Estonia Women's Cricket

Cricket
Cricket
Estonia in international cricket
Women's national cricket teams